William Howe may refer to:

 William Howe, 5th Viscount Howe (1729–1814), British general during American Revolutionary War
 William Howe (architect) (1803–1852), patented Howe truss for covered bridges
 William Howe (mayor) (1864–1952), newspaperman in Victoria, Australia
 William B. W. Howe (1824–1894), Bishop of South Carolina
 William Dean Howe (1916–1982), Canadian Member of Parliament
 William F. Howe (lawyer) (1828–1902), American trial lawyer, founded Howe and Hummel
 William F. Howe (general) (1888–1952), American stockbroker and military leader during World Wars
 William Henry Howe (1846–1929), American painter
 William T. Howe (1835–1918), farmer and political figure in New Brunswick, Canada
 William Wirt Howe (1833–1909), Justice of the Louisiana Supreme Court
 Bill Howe (1922–2007), baseball player at Yale University
 Will D. Howe (1873–1946), American educator, editor, and writer
 W. B. W. Howe Jr., (1851-1912), architect, son of the bishop